Goodenia corralina is a species of flowering plant in the family Goodeniaceae and endemic to a restricted area near Norseman in Western Australia. It is a low, spreading, perennial, herb with linear to lance-shaped leaves in a rosette at the base of the plant, and racemes of yellow flowers.

Description

Taxonomy and naming
Goodenia corralina was first formally described in 2007 by Leigh William Sage and Kelly Anne Shepherd in the journal Nuytsia from material collected near Norseman by Michael Hislop and Fred Hort in 2004. The specific epithet (corralina) is an anagram of R. Carolin, in honour of Roger Charles Carolin.

Distribution and habitat
This goodenia is only known from the type location near Norseman, where it grows in open woodland near a large granite outcrop.

Conservation status
Goddenia corralina is classified as "Priority Two" by the Western Australian Government Department of Parks and Wildlife meaning that it is poorly known and from only one or a few locations.

References

corralina
Eudicots of Western Australia
Plants described in 2007
Taxa named by Kelly Anne Shepherd